XHILA-TDT (virtual channel 66) is a full-service, Spanish-language, independent television station in Mexicali, Baja California. It broadcasts a digital signal on UHF channel 46, serving the Mexicali Valley and the southern Imperial Valley, including El Centro, California, and the Colorado River cities of San Luis Río Colorado, Sonora and Yuma, Arizona. The station is also carried on the cable television systems of each of the four principal communities it serves.

Taking to air in October 1998, the station is owned by Intermedia de Mexicali, a subsidiary of the Ciudad Juárez-based Grupo Intermedia and is licensed to its president, Arnoldo Cabada de la O.

Digital channels
The station's digital signal is multiplexed:

Analog shutdown 
Under Mexican law, XHILA would have been required to turn off its analog signal on November 26, 2013 (a date that has since been postponed), but XHILA opted to switch early, seeking and winning approval from Cofetel to shut down early.

On March 6, 2013 at 11:30 p.m., XHILA turned off its analog signal. It was the first television station in Mexicali to do so and the second in Mexico, after XHUNAM-TDT went digital-only in 2005.

In March 2018, in order to facilitate the repacking of TV services out of the 600 MHz band (channels 38-51), XHILA was assigned channel 20 for continued digital operations, however, the station did not perform the repack until November 27, making it the last station in Mexicali to do so after XHBC-TDT, XHMEX-TDT and XHMEE-TDT repacked in July 2017.

History

XHILA-TV began with experimental broadcasts in 1997, then began broadcasting commercially in October 1998. It has been owned since its inception by Intermedia de Mexicali, airing independent programming during the day, and (originally) news from CNI at night.

In 2008, XHILA became affiliated with Mexico's newest broadcast network, cadenatres.

US translators
Broadcast Group, Ltd., an American company which is controlled by the Cabada family, owns two translators in the United States that relay XHILA.

In Yuma, the analog translator was low-powered K28FM. At various times in its history, it was affiliated with musical networks such as Más Música and MTV Tr3s, and at others it rebroadcast XHILA. K28FM, in effect, was the first American affiliate of cadenatres as it relayed XHILA when it took on the affiliation in 2008. In the late 2000s, K28FM went silent; in 2015, K33MD-D, a digital translator also owned by Broadcast Group, was put into service. The license for K28FM was cancelled by the Federal Communications Commission on July 19, 2021.

In Calexico, K07ZF channel 7 was the analog translator. Given that the digital transition of XHILA's Mexicali transmitter led to a loss of viewership, channel 7 was promoted as XHILA's analog channel. In 2015, K42KZ-D, also owned by Broadcast Group, was signed on.

Both the Yuma and Calexico transmitters relay XHILA, including all of its subchannels.

K42KZ-D was assigned channel 29 in order to clear the 600 MHz band, and became K29LS-D effective November 3, 2021.

Programming
XHILA-TDT targets both sides of the U.S.-Mexican border. XHILA-TDT provides local information, news shows and variety programs for viewers along with a schedule of movies, comedies and programs of interest.

In 2015, Intermedia signed a contract with the Sistema Público de Radiodifusión del Estado Mexicano to carry its Una Voz con Todos network on its stations in Mexicali and Ciudad Juárez. This marks the first time that Mexicali has ever had national public television service.

Newscasts
Contacto Matutino –  Weekdays 6AM - 8:30AM
Contacto Vespertino –  Weekdays 6PM - 7PM
Contacto Nocturno –  Weeknights 9:00PM – 10:00PM
Con Sentido  – Weeknights 10:00PM – 11:25PM

References

External links
 Station website
 
 

Mass media in Mexicali
Television channels and stations established in 1997
Television stations in Baja California
Independent television stations in Mexico